The DDR-Oberliga (English: East German Premier League or GDR Premier League) was the top-level association football league in East Germany.

Overview

Following World War II, separate sports competitions emerged in the occupied eastern and western halves of Germany, replacing the Gauligas of the Nazi era.

In East Germany, a top-flight football competition, the highest league in the East German football league system, was established in 1949 as the DS-Oberliga (Deutscher Sportausschuss Oberliga, German Sports Association Upper League). Beginning in 1958, it carried the name DDR-Oberliga and was part of the league structure within the DFV (Deutscher Fussball-Verband der DDR, German Football Association of the GDR).

In its inaugural season in 1949/50, the DDR-Oberliga was made up of 14 teams with two relegation spots. Over the course of the next four seasons, the number of teams in the division varied and included anywhere from 17 to 19 sides with three or four relegation spots. Beginning with the 1954/55 season up until merger of the East and West German football associations in 1991/92 the league was made up of 14 teams with 2 relegation spots.

Initially, the DDR-Oberliga operated on an autumn-spring schedule, as was traditional in Germany. From 1956 to 1960, a Soviet-style spring-autumn (calendar year) schedule was in place. This required a transition round in 1955 and, although no champion was formally declared that season, SC Wismut Karl-Marx-Stadt finished atop the division. 1961/62 saw the return of an autumn-spring season and an extended schedule (39 matches vs. 26 matches) was played with each club meeting the others a total of three times – once at home, once away, and once at a neutral venue.

After German reunification, the last regular DDR-Oberliga season was played in 1990/91 under the designation NOFV-Oberliga (Nordostdeutsche Fußballverband Oberliga or Northeast German Football Federation Premier League). The following year, the East German league structure was merged into the West German system under the German Football Association (Deutscher Fussball Bund) and the top two NOFV-Oberliga clubs – F.C. Hansa Rostock and Dynamo Dresden – joined the first division Bundesliga.

For the duration of the league's existence, the league below it was the DDR-Liga.

Disbanding of the Oberliga
The Oberliga was disbanded after the 1990-91 season and its clubs were integrated in the German football league system. The fourteen Oberliga clubs went to the following leagues, spread over three tiers:

To the Fussball-Bundesliga (Tier I):
1. FC Dynamo Dresden
F.C. Hansa Rostock

To the 2. Bundesliga Nord (Tier II):
BSV Stahl Brandenburg 

To the 2. Bundesliga Süd (Tier II):
1. FC Lokomotive Leipzig
Chemnitzer FC
FC Carl Zeiss Jena
FC Rot-Weiß Erfurt
Hallescher FC

To the NOFV-Oberliga Nord (Tier III):
FC Berlin
Eisenhüttenstädter FC Stahl
FC Vorwärts Frankfurt/Oder

To the NOFV-Oberliga Mitte (Tier III):
1. FC Magdeburg
FC Energie Cottbus

To the NOFV-Oberliga Süd (Tier III):
FC Sachsen Leipzig

The Oberliga reformed as the Regionalliga Nordost
In 1994, a new third tier division was established in the area that formerly made up East Germany. The Regionalliga Nordost was made up of most of the big names of the DDR-era alongside clubs from West Berlin. The only clubs from the final season of the old DDR-Oberliga not to appear here were F.C. Hansa Rostock, which was competing at the Bundesliga level, and Hallescher FC, which had fallen on hard times.

The league was disbanded again in 2000 and its member clubs were spread between the two remaining Regionalligas (III) and the NOFV-Oberligas (IV), effectively ending the history of the all-East German leagues.

The Regionalliga Nordost returned in 2012/13 as one of five fourth-tier regional leagues. The new league will cover the area of the former GDR and Berlin and the champions of this new division will qualify for a play-off against the winner of another Regionalliga or against the second-placed team in the Regionalliga Südwest to determine promotion to the 3. Liga.

DDR-Oberliga champions

BFC Dynamo was the league record holder with 10 DDR-Oberliga titles to its credit, having won all of these titles in successive seasons.

Notes

Placings in the DDR-Oberliga 1975–1991
Clubs are named by the last names they carried before the German reunification, which are not necessarily their current ones.

 1 BSG Chemie Leipzig (since May 1990 named FC Grün-Weiß Leipzig)  and BSG Chemie Böhlen merged in August 1990, to form FC Sachsen Leipzig.
 2 The club would continue as SV Merseburg 99 (de) following German reunification. SV Merseburg 99 merged with VfB IMO Merseburg in 2019 to form 1. FC Merseburg (de).

See also
Regionalliga Nordost
NOFV-Oberliga
NOFV-Oberliga Süd
NOFV-Oberliga Mitte
NOFV-Oberliga Nord

References

External links
 The DDR-Oberliga at Fussballdaten.de
 Overall table of the DDR-Oberliga
 DDR-Oberliga results & tables
 DDR-Oberliga at Weltfussball.de
 Das deutsche Fussball Archiv
 The DDR-Oberliga at RSSSF.com
 Fußball in der DDR

 

 
1
East
Sports leagues established in 1949
1949 establishments in East Germany
1991 disestablishments in Germany
Sports leagues disestablished in 1991